Phillip Edward "Ed" Baird (born May 17, 1958) is an American sailor. He was a coach of the 1995 America's Cup-winning Team New Zealand and a helmsman for the 2007 America's Cup-winning Alinghi syndicate.

Growing up in Florida, Baird raced in the Optimist class at junior level, before moving onto other dinghies. He won the World Laser Championships in 1980 and the World J/24 Championships in 1983.

Coaching career
Baird joined Team New Zealand as a coach for the 1995 America's Cup, guiding the syndicate to New Zealand's first ever Cup win. In the same year, he won the World Match Racing Championships, and was named the US's Yachtsman of the Year.

In 1999, he skippered Young America in the Louis Vuitton series to determine the challenger for the following year's America's Cup, but the syndicate's challenge faltered when one of its two yachts nearly sank in a race against a Japanese team.

Racing highlights
Baird has also ventured into open water racing, having competed in round the world races in 1997–98 (for Innovation Kvaerner) and 2001–02 (for Djuice Dragons). As part of these offshore racing challenges, Baird was a member of the winning team in the grueling, Sydney to Hobart Race in 2000, aboard the maxi yacht, Nicorette II.

As the helmsman of the Alinghi team for the 2007 America's Cup, he led the syndicate to win the series 5-2 against his former team, Team New Zealand. Later in 2007, he was named the International Sailing Federation's male World Sailor of the Year. 

Winning 4 of 5 events, Baird skippered Alinghi’s Extreme 40 to a dominant win on the iShares Extreme-40 Catamaran Circuit in 2008. He then coached team owner, Ernesto Bertarelli, who helmed the massive catamaran, Alinghi 5 in the 2010 America's Cup.

From 2011 to 2016, Baird skippered the US-flagged, Quantum Racing TP 52 to win four seasons of the Audi MedCup/52 Super Series  and three TP 52 World Championships. Baird currently races on international circuits for the TP 52 and RC 44 .

While best known as a champion match racer and fleet racing helmsman, Baird has also coached world and Olympic champions such as Anna Tunnicliffe, Sally Barkow and Kevin Mahaney. He was a premier instructor for North-U’s Tactical and speed clinics in the 1990s, and he has written an instructional book (Laser Racing) and over a hundred tactical how-to articles. Baird has worked with ESPN, Outdoor Life Network, Versus, and Television New Zealand as an expert commentator for shows about sailboat racing.

Baird was inducted into the National Sailing Hall of Fame in 2016, and he was inducted into the America's Cup Hall of Fame in 2021.

References

External links 
 

1958 births
Living people
2000 America's Cup sailors
2007 America's Cup sailors
Alinghi sailors
American male sailors (sport)
Circumnavigators of the globe
Extreme Sailing Series sailors
ISAF World Sailor of the Year (male)
Laser class sailors
Laser class world champions
Luna Rossa Challenge sailors
North American Champions Soling
Team New Zealand sailors
TP52 class world champions
US Sailor of the Year
Volvo Ocean Race sailors
World champions in sailing for the United States
University of South Florida alumni
South Florida Bulls athletes